Jainti Dass Saggar (6 September 1898 – 14 November 1954) was an Indian-born doctor in Dundee, Scotland, who in 1936 became the first non-white local authority councillor in Scotland. He served 18 years as a Labour Party councillor and was one of Dundee's longest-serving council members.

Early life and family
Jainti Saggar was born on 6 September 1898 in the village of Deharru in Ludhiana district, Punjab, British India. He was the second son and the fourth of six children of Hindu parents, Ram Saran Dass Saggar (1870–1943), a merchant, and his wife, Sardhi Devi Uppal.

Saggar married Jane Quinn, the daughter of a bailie and town councillor of Dundee.

Medicine
In 1919, Saggar moved to the United Kingdom to study medicine at the University of St Andrews and completed postgraduate diplomas in ophthalmology, public health, and surgery. He served as chairman of the public libraries committee and was a member of the committee of the local branch of the Nursery Schools Association of Great Britain. He was the only Indian doctor in Dundee in the 1920s.

Politics
In 1936, Saggar was elected as a Labour Party councillor in Dundee, making him the first non-white local authority councillor in Scotland. In 1939, he was instrumental in the selection of Krishna Menon as parliamentary candidate for Dundee.

In the late 1930s, Saggar became involved in the debate about imports of cheap jute products from India that were undercutting the profits of manufacturers in Glasgow and the wages of local workers. He was part of a joint delegation of manufacturers and trade unionists that travelled to London to call for the British government to protect the British jute industry, claiming before he went that "as long as cheap labour in India, working under both British and Indian capital, went on increasing, the over production of cheap commodities would have a detrimental effect on Dundee." The matter was part of a wider debate in the 1930s in which British manufacturers and labour felt that their profits and wages might be being sacrificed for the sake of keeping the colonies happy. Saggar called for higher wages for Indian workers which would have had the effect of making their output more expensive and less of a competitive threat in Glasgow.

He was one of the longest-serving members of Dundee Town Council.

Death and legacy
Saggar died of an intracerebral haemorrhage on 14 November 1954 at the Royal Infirmary, Dundee. The Lord Provost of Dundee, William Hughes, paid tribute to him after his death, saying: "He was a man of compassion for everyone in need ... he came to Dundee from halfway across the world but no son of Dundee had greater love for its people or worked harder in their interest. Dundee is much poorer by his passing."

Twenty years after his death, the Dundee Corporation named Saggar Street after him. He had at one time supported the building of houses on this same site.  In 1974, a public library was opened in memory of him and his brother.

In 2015 his daughter, Kamala Stewart and her husband, John Stewart, published his biography, entitled Dr Jainti Dass Saggar – from Deharru to Dundee, with the help of their daughter, Rosemary McKnight.

References

20th-century Scottish medical doctors
1898 births
1954 deaths
People from Ludhiana district
British India emigrants to the United Kingdom
Scottish Labour councillors
Scottish people of Punjabi descent
Scottish general practitioners
Scottish ophthalmologists
Indian ophthalmologists
Alumni of the University of St Andrews
Councillors in Dundee
20th-century surgeons